Hermann Rosendorff (1860–1935) was a violinist. Born in Berlin, he arrived in Australia in 1879. By 1887 he was first violin in J. B. Hickie's Theatre orchestra and enjoyed a career of thirty years involvement with His Majesty's Brisbane. He is best remembered for conducting the J. C. Williamson productions over a thirty-year span, but also arranged and composed a few pieces for piano and violin.

Personal 
Rosendorff married Genevra Hartley Hutchinson on 21 November 1883. His eldest daughter Fanny Turbayne (née Rosendorff, 1885–1969) was also a composer. He died in Queensland on 6 January 1935, survived by his widow, five daughters and four sons.

Works
 'Summer' Orchestral Overture 
 'Frangipanni' duet for violin and piano
 Serenade pour violon and piano
 Ungeduld (An arrangement of Schubert) for piano and violin
 Meditation violon solo
 Romance et Rondeau fantastique for violin and piano 
 'Old Folks at Home' (arrangement for violin and piano)
 Crown of Gold Orchestral overture

References 

1860 births
1935 deaths
Australian male composers
German emigrants to Australia